The 2019 South Derbyshire District Council election took place on 2 May 2019 to elect members of South Derbyshire District Council in England. This was the same day as other local elections.

Results summary

|-

Ward results

Aston

Church Gresley

Etwall

Hatton

Hilton

Linton

Melbourne

Midway

Newhall and Stanton

Repton

Seales

Stenson

Swadlincote

Willington and Findern

Woodville

By-elections

Seale

References

2019 English local elections
May 2019 events in the United Kingdom
2019
2010s in Derbyshire